Šop-Đokić is a Serbian family from Leskovac, whose family house in the town, built in the first half of the 19th century, is a cultural monument, protected by the state. The house is one several old buildings in the Balkan style. Kostadin Šop-Đokić was the president of the board for building and renovating churches in the municipality of Leskovac in 1931.  The family has retrieved some of its formerly owned property taken away by the state, and is looking to retrieve the family house, which is today a symbol of Leskovac and the location of the city tourist organization.

References

Sources

Serbian families
Serbian surnames
People from Leskovac
Compound surnames